"I Got You" is a song co-written and recorded by American country music duo Thompson Square. It was released in May 2011 as the third single from their self-titled debut album.

Content
Written by the duo along with Jason Sellers and Paul Jenkins, "I Got You" is a lyric about two lovers who need each other, comparing themselves to various objects that need others in order to work.

Critical reception
William Ruhlmann of Allmusic thought that it was a "variation" on the theme of "a love story from initial smooch through exchanged vows" established by "Are You Gonna Kiss Me or Not".

Music video
The music video, shot by Wes Edwards over the course of two days, features the duo wearing several different costumes.

Chart performance

Year-end charts

References

2011 singles
2011 songs
Thompson Square songs
BBR Music Group singles
Song recordings produced by New Voice Entertainment
Songs written by Paul Jenkins (songwriter)
Songs written by Jason Sellers
Music videos directed by Wes Edwards